The 4th Golden Globe Awards, honoring the best achievements in 1946 filmmaking, were held on 26 February 1947 at the Hollywood Roosevelt Hotel in Los Angeles, California.

Winners

Best Picture 
 The Best Years of Our Lives directed by William Wyler

Best Actor in a Leading Role 
 Gregory Peck - The Yearling

Best Actress in a Leading Role 
 Rosalind Russell - Sister Kenny

Best Performance by an Actor in a Supporting Role in a Motion Picture 
 Clifton Webb - The Razor's Edge

Best Performance by an Actress in a Supporting Role in a Motion Picture 
 Anne Baxter - The Razor's Edge

Best Director-Motion Picture 
 Frank Capra - It's a Wonderful Life

Best Film Promoting International Understanding
 The Last Chance directed by Leopold Lindtberg

Special Achievement Award
 Harold Russell - The Best Years of Our Lives

See also
 Hollywood Foreign Press Association
 1st Cannes Film Festival
 19th Academy Awards
 1946 in film

References

004
1946 film awards
1946 television awards
February 1947 events in the United States